Stanisław Jan Skarżyński (23 April 1897 in Aleksandrów – 15 July 1920 near Zwierowce) was a Polish pilot who fought and died in the Polish-Soviet War. For his actions he received the highest military order of Poland, Virtuti Militari, posthumously.

1897 births
1920 deaths
Polish Air Force officers
Recipients of the Silver Cross of the Virtuti Militari
Polish people of the Polish–Soviet War
Polish military personnel killed in action